Tina Čarman (born 8 January 1978 in Kranj) is a retired Slovenian long jumper. She was selected to compete for the Slovenian Olympic team in the long jump at the 2004 Summer Olympics after recording a personal best of 6.56 metres from a national athletics meet in Dolenjske Toplice. Carman also trained as a member of the athletics squad for the Dolenjske Toplice Sports Club under her coach Dobrivoje Vučkovič.

Carman qualified for the Slovenian squad in the women's long jump at the 2004 Summer Olympics in Athens. A year before the Games, she jumped 6.56 metres to attain both her personal best and an Olympic B-standard at  a national athletics meet in Dolenjske Toplice. During the prelims, Carman fouled in two consecutive attempts until she satisfied her final jump with a spanning distance of 5.72 metres, placing her in the thirty-sixth position against a vast field of thirty-nine long jumpers.

References

External links

1978 births
Living people
Slovenian female long jumpers
Olympic athletes of Slovenia
Athletes (track and field) at the 2004 Summer Olympics
Sportspeople from Kranj